The 2008–09 Elitserien season was the 34th season of Elitserien. It began on September 15, 2008, with the regular season ending February 28, 2009. The playoffs of the 85th Swedish Championship ended on April 8, with Färjestads BK taking the championship. The season started earlier than previous seasons due to the 2009 Men's World Ice Hockey Championships in Switzerland had been scheduled earlier than normal.

League business
The match start time for Saturday matches was changed to start at 16:00 local time (UTC+1) instead of 15:00 as in previous seasons.

Regular season 
Djurgårdens IF changed their arena for home matches from Stockholm Globe Arena to Hovet. Also, Rögle BK changed to a new arena, Lindab Arena in Ängelholm.

The first goal of the season was scored by Lars Eller of Frölunda HC in Jönköping against HV71.

In the end of the regular season, Peter Forsberg played three games for Modo Hockey, totalling 3 points.

The top team: Färjestads BK, Linköpings HC, Frölunda HC, HV71, Luleå HF, Skellefteå AIK, Brynäs IF, and Timrå IK advanced to the playoffs.  Whereas the bottom two teams advanced to the 2008-09 Kvalserien.

Final standings 
GP = Games Played, W = Wins, L = Losses, T = Ties, OTW = Overtime Wins, OTL = Overtime Losses, GF = Goals For, GA = Goals Against, Pts = Points

Game log 

|-
|7||Monday, September 15||HV71||6–2||Frölunda HC||Kinnarps Arena||7,038
|-
|rowspan="6"|1||rowspan="6"|Thursday, September 18||Skellefteå AIK||5–4 (OT)||Rögle BK||Skellefteå Kraft Arena||5,483
|-
|Timrå IK||6–5||HV71||E.ON Arena||5,414
|-
|Brynäs IF||3–2 (OT)||Färjestads BK||Läkerol Arena||6,365
|-
|Djurgårdens IF||2–1||Luleå HF||Hovet||6,748
|-
|Södertälje SK||2–1||Frölunda HC||AXA Sports Center||4,549
|-
|Linköpings HC||4–2||Modo Hockey||Cloetta Center||7,148
|-
|rowspan="5"|2||rowspan="4"|Saturday, September 20||Luleå HF||3–2||Skellefteå AIK||COOP Arena||5,600
|-
|Modo Hockey||2–2||Södertälje SK||Swedbank Arena||6,772
|-
|Frölunda HC||1–2||Linköpings HC||Scandinavium||10,314
|-
|Rögle BK||4–1||Färjestads BK||Lindab Arena||5,095
|-
|rowspan="1"|Sunday, September 21||HV71||1–3||Brynäs IF||Kinnarps Arena||6,893
|-
|rowspan="6"|3||rowspan="3"|Monday, September 22||Timrå IK||3–2 (OT)||Frölunda HC||E.ON Arena||5,337
|-
|Skellefteå AIK||4–5||Linköpings HC||Skellefteå Kraft Arena||4,568
|-
|Färjestads BK||2–0||Luleå HF||Löfbergs Lila Arena||5,447
|-
|rowspan="3"|Tuesday, September 23||Rögle BK||1–3||Modo Hockey||Lindab Arena||4,933
|-
|Brynäs IF||1–4||Djurgårdens IF||Läkerol Arena||5,211
|-
|Södertälje SK||3–3||HV71||AXA Sports Center||3,318
|-
|rowspan="6"|4||rowspan="6"|Thursday, September 25||Luleå HF||3–4 (OT)||Rögle BK||COOP Arena||4,012
|-
|Brynäs IF||3–2||Timrå IK||Läkerol Arena||4,191
|-
|Djurgårdens IF||2–5||Färjestads BK||Hovet||6,093
|-
|Linköpings HC||3–3||Södertälje SK||Cloetta Center||6,458
|-
|HV71||0–3||Skellefteå AIK||Kinnarps Arena||6,914
|-
|Frölunda HC||3–2 (OT)||Modo Hockey||Scandinavium||10,159
|-
|rowspan="6"|5||rowspan="6"|Saturday, September 27||Luleå HF||2–3||HV71||COOP Arena||3,857
|-
|Skellefteå AIK||3–1||Södertälje SK||Skellefteå Kraft Arena||5,184
|-
|Modo Hockey||6–3||Djurgårdens IF||Swedbank Arena||7,021
|-
|Rögle BK||3–4||Brynäs IF||Lindab Arena||4,806
|-
|Linköpings HC||4–5||Timrå IK||Cloetta Center||6,940
|-
|Färjestads BK||2–1||Frölunda HC||Löfbergs Lila Arena||7,483
|-
|rowspan="6"|6||rowspan="3"|Monday, September 29||HV71||1–3||Linköpings HC||Kinnarps Arena||6,965
|-
|Frölunda HC||4–1||Rögle BK||Scandinavium||10,297
|-
|Brynäs IF||5–4||Modo Hockey||Läkerol Arena||5,574
|-
|rowspan="3"|Tuesday, September 30||Timrå IK||3–1||Luleå HF||E.ON Arena||5,241
|-
|Djurgårdens IF||3–2 (OT)||Skellefteå AIK||Hovet||5,113
|-
|Södertälje SK||0–2||Färjestads BK||AXA Sports Center||3,757
|-

|-
|rowspan="5"|7||rowspan="5"|Thursday, October 2||Rögle BK||4–1||Södertälje SK||Lindab Arena||4,008
|-
|Linköpings HC||3–2 (OT)||Djurgårdens IF||Cloetta Center||6,778
|-
|Modo Hockey||4–3||Timrå IK||Swedbank Arena||7,410
|-
|Skellefteå AIK||3–0||Färjestads BK||Skellefteå Kraft Arena||5,148
|-
|Luleå HF||2–4||Brynäs IF||COOP Arena||3,864
|-
|rowspan="4"|8||rowspan="5"|Saturday, October 4||Brynäs IF||2–0||Linköpings HC||Läkerol Arena||7,287
|-
|Timrå IK||4–5||Rögle BK||E.ON Arena||5,306
|-
|Södertälje SK||4–3 (OT)||Luleå HF||AXA Sports Center||4,077
|-
|Färjestads BK||1–3||Modo Hockey||Löfbergs Lila Arena||6,131
|-
|rowspan="1"|20||HV71||3–2||Djurgårdens IF||Kinnarps Arena||6,908
|-
|8||Sunday, October 5||Frölunda HC||2–1||Skellefteå AIK||Scandinavium||11,488
|-
|10||Monday, October 6||Linköpings HC||4–1||Luleå HF||Cloetta Center||5,611
|-
|2||Tuesday, October 7||Djurgårdens IF||2–1||Timrå IK||Hovet||5,828
|-
|rowspan="6"|9||rowspan="6"|Thursday, October 9||Luleå HF||8–2||Frölunda HC||COOP Arena||4,180
|-
|Skellefteå AIK||5–2||Brynäs IF||Skellefteå Kraft Arena||5,296
|-
|Modo Hockey||1–5||HV71||Swedbank Arena||6,024
|-
|Rögle BK||3–3||Djurgårdens IF||Lindab Arena||4,973
|-
|Södertälje SK||5–2||Timrå IK||AXA Sports Center||3,219
|-
|Färjestads BK||0–3||Linköpings HC||Löfbergs Lila Arena||5,125
|-
|rowspan="5"|10||rowspan="5"|Saturday, October 11||Timrå IK||4–6||Färjestads BK||E.ON Arena||4,961
|-
|HV71||3–2 (OT)||Rögle BK||Kinnarps Arena||7,038
|-
|Djurgårdens IF||1–5||Frölunda HC||Hovet||6,055
|-
|Brynäs IF||1–0||Södertälje SK||Läkerol Arena||6,578
|-
|Skellefteå AIK||4–2||Modo Hockey||Skellefteå Kraft Arena||5,820
|-
|rowspan="6"|11||rowspan="3"|Monday, October 13||Timrå IK||3–2 (OT)||Skellefteå AIK||E.ON Arena||4,889
|-
|Södertälje SK||2–4||Djurgårdens IF||AXA Sports Center||4,611
|-
|Frölunda HC||1–1||Brynäs IF||Scandinavium||11,188
|-
|rowspan="3"|Tuesday, October 14||Färjestads BK||4–2||HV71||Löfbergs Lila Arena||6,023
|-
|Rögle BK||3–2||Linköpings HC||Lindab Arena||4,764
|-
|Modo Hockey||3–2 (OT)||Luleå HF||Swedbank Arena||5,809
|-
|rowspan="6"|12||rowspan="6"|Thursday, October 16||HV71||2–1 (OT)||Timrå IK||Kinnarps Arena||6,849
|-
|Linköpings HC||4–0||Färjestads BK||Cloetta Center||8,040
|-
|Djurgårdens IF||2–1 (OT)||Rögle BK||Hovet||4,679
|-
|Brynäs IF||5–1||Skellefteå AIK||Läkerol Arena||5,197
|-
|Modo Hockey||3–2||Frölunda HC||Swedbank Arena||5,492
|-
|Luleå HF||6–2||Södertälje SK||COOP Arena||5,340
|-
|rowspan="6"|13||rowspan="6"|Saturday, October 18||Skellefteå AIK||4–1||Luleå HF||Skellefteå Kraft Arena||6,001
|-
|Frölunda HC||5–3||HV71||Scandinavium||12,044
|-
|Färjestads BK||5–1||Brynäs IF||Löfbergs Lila Arena||7,144
|-
|Södertälje SK||2–3 (OT)||Modo Hockey||AXA Sports Center||3,801
|-
|Djurgårdens IF||3–1||Linköpings HC||Hovet||5,657
|-
|Rögle BK||5–1||Timrå IK||Lindab Arena||4,837
|-
|14||rowspan="2"|Tuesday, October 21||Frölunda HC||2–2||Färjestads BK||Scandinavium||11,715
|-
|8||HV71||2–2||Djurgårdens IF||Kinnarps Arena||6,987
|-
|rowspan="5"|14||rowspan="5"|Thursday, October 23||HV71||6–3||Södertälje SK||Kinnarps Arena||6,851
|-
|Rögle BK||1–2||Skellefteå AIK||Lindab Arena||4,801
|-
|Timrå IK||3–1||Brynäs IF||E.ON Arena||5,540
|-
|Modo Hockey||3–5||Linköpings HC||Swedbank Arena||5,514
|-
|Luleå HF||4–5 (OT)||Djurgårdens IF||COOP Arena||5,501
|-
|rowspan="6"|15||rowspan="6"|Saturday, October 25||Färjestads BK||2–3||Rögle BK||Löfbergs Lila Arena||6,788
|-
|Södertälje SK||2–3||Skellefteå AIK||AXA Sports Center||4,515
|-
|HV71||2–5||Modo Hockey||Kinnarps Arena||7,020
|-
|Brynäs IF||2–4||Luleå HF||Läkerol Arena||8,180
|-
|Linköpings HC||2–3 (OT)||Frölunda HC||Cloetta Center||8,500
|-
|Timrå IK||3–2 (OT)||Djurgårdens IF||E.ON Arena||5,373
|-
|rowspan="6"|16||rowspan="3"|Monday, October 27||Linköpings HC||1–2 (OT)||HV71||Cloetta Center||8,500
|-
|Luleå HF||1–0||Färjestads BK||COOP Arena||5,207
|-
|Rögle BK||6–3||Frölunda HC||Lindab Arena||5,040
|-
|rowspan="3"|Tuesday, October 28||Djurgårdens IF||3–5||Södertälje SK||Hovet||7,483
|-
|Skellefteå AIK||3–4 (OT)||Timrå IK||Skellefteå Kraft Arena||5,751
|-
|Modo Hockey||6–0||Brynäs IF||Swedbank Arena||6,506
|-
|rowspan="6"|17||rowspan="6"|Thursday, October 30||Färjestads BK||2–1||Djurgårdens IF||Löfbergs Lila Arena||7,652
|-
|Södertälje SK||4–5 (OT)||Linköpings HC||AXA Sports Center||3,855
|-
|Frölunda HC||3–1||Luleå HF||Scandinavium||11,537
|-
|Brynäs IF||1–2||Rögle BK||Läkerol Arena||5,801
|-
|Skellefteå AIK||5–1||HV71||Skellefteå Kraft Arena||5,665
|-
|Timrå IK||0–4||Modo Hockey||E.ON Arena||6,000
|-

|-
|rowspan="5"|18||rowspan="5"|Saturday, November 1||Luleå HF||5–1||Timrå IK||COOP Arena||4,650
|-
|Djurgårdens IF||3–6||Frölunda HC||Hovet||6,345
|-
|HV71||4–3||Färjestads BK||Kinnarps Arena||7,038
|-
|Södertälje SK||4–1||Brynäs IF||AXA Sports Center||4,682
|-
|Modo Hockey||2–3||Rögle BK||Swedbank Arena||6,962
|-
|rowspan="6"|19||rowspan="6"|Monday, November 3||Timrå IK||2–3||Linköpings HC||E.ON Arena||4,817
|-
|Modo Hockey||4–3||Djurgårdens IF||Swedbank Arena||5,444
|-
|Brynäs IF||4–3 (OT)||HV71||Läkerol Arena||4,408
|-
|Skellefteå AIK||1–3||Frölunda HC||Skellefteå Kraft Arena||5,252
|-
|Färjestads BK||2–2||Södertälje SK||Löfbergs Lila Arena||6,100
|-
|Rögle BK||3–5||Luleå HF||Lindab Arena||4,920
|-
|18||Monday, November 10||Linköpings HC||5–3||Skellefteå AIK||Cloetta Center||6,168
|-
|31||Tuesday, November 11||Djurgårdens IF||7–0||Modo Hockey||Hovet||5,793
|-
|rowspan="5"|20||rowspan="5"|Thursday, November 13||Linköpings HC||3–1||Brynäs IF||Cloetta Center||8,237
|-
|Frölunda HC||0–2||Timrå IK||Scandinavium||11,020
|-
|Färjestads BK||5–2||Skellefteå AIK||Löfbergs Lila Arena||5,488
|-
|Södertälje SK||3–2||Rögle BK||AXA Sports Center||3,895
|-
|Luleå HF||3–2||Modo Hockey||COOP Arena||4,958
|-
|rowspan="6"|21||rowspan="6"|Saturday, November 15||Rögle BK||1–2||HV71||Lindab Arena||5,043
|-
|Brynäs IF||2–1||Frölunda HC||Läkerol Arena||7,974
|-
|Timrå IK||2–0||Södertälje SK||E.ON Arena||5,332
|-
|Färjestads BK||5–2||Modo Hockey||Löfbergs Lila Arena||7,213
|-
|Skellefteå AIK||2–2||Djurgårdens IF||Skellefteå Kraft Arena||5,636
|-
|Luleå HF||3–1||Linköpings HC||COOP Arena||4,964
|-
|rowspan="6"|22||rowspan="3"|Monday, November 17||Frölunda HC||3–2||Södertälje SK||Scandinavium||11,248
|-
|Linköpings HC||3–1||Rögle BK||Cloetta Center||6,565
|-
|Modo Hockey||0–6||Skellefteå AIK||Swedbank Arena||7,539
|-
|rowspan="3"|Tuesday, November 18||HV71||1–1||Luleå HF||Kinnarps Arena||7,013
|-
|Färjestads BK||2–0||Timrå IK||Löfbergs Lila Arena||5,186
|-
|Djurgårdens IF||2–4||Brynäs IF||Hovet||7,131
|-
|rowspan="6"|23||rowspan="6"|Thursday, November 20||Rögle BK||3–0||Modo Hockey||Lindab Arena||4,384
|-
|Djurgårdens IF||1–4||Frölunda HC||Hovet||4,227
|-
|Brynäs IF||2–2||Färjestads BK||Läkerol Arena||5,521
|-
|Timrå IK||3–2 (OT)||Luleå HF||E.ON Arena||5,140
|-
|Skellefteå AIK||2–4||Linköpings HC||Skellefteå Kraft Arena||5,277
|-
|Södertälje SK||2–3 (OT)||HV71||AXA Sports Center||3,526
|-
|rowspan="6"|24||rowspan="6"|Saturday, November 22||Linköpings HC||2–6||Timrå IK||Cloetta Center||7,632
|-
|HV71||3–4 (OT)||Skellefteå AIK||Kinnarps Arena||6,951
|-
|Färjestads BK||0–2||Frölunda HC||Löfbergs Lila Arena||8,250
|-
|Rögle BK||4–3||Djurgårdens IF||Lindab Arena||4,675
|-
|Luleå HF||3–3||Brynäs IF||COOP Arena||5,105
|-
|Modo Hockey||3–0||Södertälje SK||Swedbank Arena||5,971
|-
|rowspan="6"|25||rowspan="3"|Monday, November 24||Brynäs IF||1–0||Södertälje SK||Löfbergs Lila Arena||3,978
|-
|Djurgårdens IF||4–2||Timrå IK||Hovet||3,319
|-
|Luleå HF||1–1||HV71||COOP Arena||4,378
|-
|rowspan="3"|Tuesday, November 25||Frölunda HC||5–0||Rögle BK||Scandinavium||11,011
|-
|Skellefteå AIK||3–2 (OT)||Färjestads BK||Skellefteå Kraft Arena||4,531
|-
|Linköpings HC||1–5||Modo Hockey||Cloetta Center||6,889
|-
|rowspan="6"|26||rowspan="6"|Thursday, November 27||HV71||2–3 (OT)||Frölunda HC||Kinnarps Arena||7,038
|-
|Modo Hockey||3–7||Luleå HF||Swedbank Arena||6,151
|-
|Timrå IK||4–3||Skellefteå AIK||E.ON Arena||5,396
|-
|Rögle BK||4–3||Brynäs IF||Lindab Arena||4,744
|-
|Södertälje SK||4–1||Djurgårdens IF||AXA Sports Center||3,926
|-
|Färjestads BK||4–1||Linköpings HC||Löfbergs Lila Arena||5,482
|-
|rowspan="6"|27||rowspan="5"|Saturday, November 29||Modo Hockey||3–4||Färjestads BK||Swedbank Arena||7,029
|-
|Djurgårdens IF||1–5||HV71||Hovet||6,092
|-
|Brynäs IF||2–1||Timrå IK||Läkerol Arena||7,066
|-
|Luleå HF||5–3||Rögle BK||COOP Arena||5,191
|-
|Skellefteå AIK||4–3||Södertälje SK||Skellefteå Kraft Arena||5,163
|-
||Sunday, November 30||Frölunda HC||0–5||Linköpings HC||Scandinavium||11,061
|-

|-
|rowspan="5"|28||rowspan="3"|Monday, December 1||Södertälje SK||3–1||Färjestads BK||AXA Sports Center||3,141
|-
|Skellefteå AIK||2–2||Brynäs IF||Skellefteå Kraft Arena||4,704
|-
|HV71||3–2||Rögle BK||Kinnarps Arena||6,865
|-
|rowspan="2"|Tuesday, December 2||Linköpings HC||3–3||Djurgårdens IF||Cloetta Center||6,978
|-
|Luleå HF||2–1||Frölunda HC||COOP Arena||5,005
|-
|rowspan="6"|29||rowspan="6"|Thursday, December 4||Färjestads BK||5–3||Luleå HF||Löfbergs Lila Arena||5,254
|-
|Brynäs IF||2–1 (OT)||Linköpings HC||Läkerol Arena||4,882
|-
|Timrå IK||3–2 (OT)||HV71||E.ON Arena||5,409
|-
|Rögle BK||4–5 (OT)||Södertälje SK||Lindab Arena||4,534
|-
|Djurgårdens IF||0–2||Skellefteå AIK||Hovet||3,930
|-
|Frölunda HC||6–1||Modo Hockey||Scandinavium||11,459
|-
|rowspan="5"|30||rowspan="5"|Saturday, December 6||HV71||2–2||Brynäs IF||Kinnarps Arena||6,982
|-
|Södertälje SK||1–2||Frölunda HC||AXA Sports Center||3,629
|-
|Skellefteå AIK||4–5 (OT)||Modo Hockey||Skellefteå Kraft Arena||5,676
|-
|Timrå IK||5–2||Rögle BK||E.ON Arena||5,239
|-
|Djurgårdens IF||3–2||Färjestads BK||Hovet||5,029
|-
|rowspan="5"|31||rowspan="3"|Monday, December 8||HV71||5–6||Linköpings HC||Kinnarps Arena||7,038
|-
|Rögle BK||1–3||Färjestads BK||Lindab Arena||4,789
|-
|Frölunda HC||4–2||Brynäs IF||Scandinavium||11,582
|-
|rowspan="2"|Tuesday, December 9||Luleå HF||2–1||Skellefteå AIK||COOP Arena||5,600
|-
|Södertälje SK||3–2||Timrå IK||AXA Sports Center||2,858
|-
|rowspan="6"|32||rowspan="6"|Thursday, December 11||Linköpings HC||1–2||Södertälje SK||Cloetta Center||6,209
|-
|Färjestads BK||2–3||HV71||Löfbergs Lila Arena||5,631
|-
|Djurgårdens IF||3–2 (OT)||Luleå HF||Hovet||3,936
|-
|Brynäs IF||1–2 (OT)||Modo Hockey||Läkerol Arena||5,354
|-
|Timrå IK||4–3 (OT)||Frölunda HC||E.ON Arena||5,042
|-
|Skellefteå AIK||5–2||Rögle BK||Skellefteå Kraft Arena||4,529
|-
|rowspan="6"|33||rowspan="5"|Saturday, December 13||Brynäs IF||3–3||Djurgårdens IF||Läkerol Arena||7,465
|-
|Frölunda HC||0–2||Skellefteå AIK||Scandinavium||10,666
|-
|Södertälje SK||1–2||Luleå HF||AXA Sports Center||3,750
|-
|Rögle BK||5–5||Linköpings HC||Lindab Arena||4,539
|-
|Timrå IK||0–3||Färjestads BK||E.ON Arena||4,902
|-
|Sunday, December 14||Modo Hockey||1–4||HV71||Swedbank Arena||5,562
|-
|30||Monday, December 15||Linköpings HC||3–6||Luleå HF||Cloetta Center||7,464
|-
|rowspan="6"|34||rowspan="6"|Friday, December 26||Frölunda HC||3–2 (OT)||Färjestads BK||Scandinavium||12,044
|-
|HV71||3–2||Södertälje SK||Kinnarps Arena||7,038
|-
|Linköpings HC||5–3||Brynäs IF||Cloetta Center||8,500
|-
|Djurgårdens IF||3–1||Rögle BK||Hovet||7,032
|-
|Skellefteå AIK||1–3||Timrå IK||Skellefteå Kraft Arena||6,001
|-
|Luleå HF||4–2||Modo Hockey||COOP Arena||5,600
|-
|rowspan="6"|35||rowspan="6"|Sunday, December 28||Färjestads BK||4–1||Djurgårdens IF||Löfbergs Lila Arena||8,073
|-
|Södertälje SK||2–1||Skellefteå AIK||AXA Sports Center||3,885
|-
|Rögle BK||3–1||Luleå HF||Lindab Arena||5,007
|-
|Brynäs IF||4–6||HV71||Läkerol Arena||6,202
|-
|Timrå IK||1–1||Linköpings HC||E.ON Arena||5,781
|-
|Modo Hockey||1–3||Frölunda HC||Swedbank Arena||7,600
|-
|rowspan="6"|36||rowspan="6"|Tuesday, December 30||Luleå HF||2–1||Färjestads BK||COOP Arena||5,283
|-
|Brynäs IF||4–1||Rögle BK||Läkerol Arena||5,765
|-
|Djurgårdens IF||3–3||Södertälje SK||Hovet||6,525
|-
|Linköpings HC||5–2||Skellefteå AIK||Cloetta Center||8,046
|-
|HV71||3–2||Modo Hockey||Kinnarps Arena||7,038
|-
|Frölunda HC||2–1||Timrå IK||Scandinavium||11,362
|-

|-
|rowspan="6"|37||rowspan="6"|Saturday, January 3||Djurgårdens IF||1–2||HV71||Hovet||8,092
|-
|Skellefteå AIK||7–1||Luleå HF||Skellefteå Kraft Arena||6,001
|-
|Modo Hockey||3–2||Färjestads BK||Swedbank Arena||6,726
|-
|Rögle BK||3–2||Timrå IK||Lindab Arena||4,916
|-
|Södertälje SK||1–2 (OT)||Brynäs IF||AXA Sports Center||4,698
|-
|Frölunda HC||2–3||Linköpings HC||Scandinavium||11,800
|-
|rowspan="6"|38||rowspan="6"|Monday, January 5||Färjestads BK||3–2||Brynäs IF||Löfbergs Lila Arena||6,394
|-
|Södertälje SK||2–4||Linköpings HC||AXA Sports Center||3,335
|-
|Rögle BK||6–5||HV71||Lindab Arena||4,940
|-
|Timrå IK||4–1||Modo Hockey||E.ON Arena||6,000
|-
|Skellefteå AIK||5–3||Frölunda HC||Skellefteå Kraft Arena||5,475
|-
|Luleå HF||2–6||Djurgårdens IF||COOP Arena||4,599
|-
|rowspan="4"|39||rowspan="4"|Thursday, January 8||HV71||1–1||Timrå IK||Kinnarps Arena||6,904
|-
|Färjestads BK||5–1||Skellefteå AIK||Löfbergs Lila Arena||5,718
|-
|Brynäs IF||1–0||Luleå HF||Läkerol Arena||4,363
|-
|Modo Hockey||5–2||Rögle BK||Swedbank Arena||5,544
|-
|rowspan="5"|40||rowspan="5"|Saturday, January 10||HV71||2–0||Färjestads BK||Kinnarps Arena||7,038
|-
|Linköpings HC||3–3||Rögle BK||Cloetta Center||8,443
|-
|Södertälje SK||2–7||Modo Hockey||AXA Sports Center||3,720
|-
|Brynäs IF||5–4||Skellefteå AIK||Läkerol Arena||6,234
|-
|Timrå IK||4–2||Djurgårdens IF||E.ON Arena||5,307
|-
|28||rowspan="2"|Monday, January 12||Modo Hockey||2–1||Timrå IK||Swedbank Arena||6,626
|-
|39||Djurgårdens IF||5–1||Linköpings HC||Hovet||4,573
|-
|40||Tuesday, January 13||Frölunda HC||1–2||Luleå HF||Scandinavium||10,568
|-
|rowspan="6"|41||rowspan="6"|Thursday, January 15||Linköpings HC||3–3||HV71||Cloetta Center||8,500
|-
|Färjestads BK||6–3||Södertälje SK||Löfbergs Lila Arena||5,378
|-
|Rögle BK||5–0||Frölunda HC||Lindab Arena||4,975
|-
|Modo Hockey||2–1||Brynäs IF||Swedbank Arena||5,768
|-
|Skellefteå AIK||1–2||Djurgårdens IF||Skellefteå Kraft Arena||4,491
|-
|Luleå HF||3–4||Timrå IK||COOP Arena||4,892
|-
|rowspan="6"|42||rowspan="6"|Saturday, January 17||Luleå HF||0–2||Linköpings HC||COOP Arena||4,995
|-
|Färjestads BK||6–2||Rögle BK||Löfbergs Lila Arena||6,921
|-
|Djurgårdens IF||5–3||Modo Hockey||Hovet||7,549
|-
|Brynäs IF||3–1||Frölunda HC||Läkerol Arena||7,909
|-
|Timrå IK||4–2||Södertälje SK||E.ON Arena||5,141
|-
|Skellefteå AIK||2–4||HV71||Skellefteå Kraft Arena||5,400
|-
|rowspan="2"|43||rowspan="2"|Monday, January 19||Linköpings HC||3–3||Färjestads BK||Cloetta Center||7,149
|-
|HV71||2–1||Luleå HF||Kinnarps Arena||7,038
|-
|39||Tuesday, January 20||Frölunda HC||3–1||Södertälje SK||Scandinavium||10,036
|-
|rowspan="4"|43||rowspan="4"|Thursday, January 22||Frölunda HC||1–2||Djurgårdens IF||Scandinavium||10,850
|-
|Timrå IK||4–1||Brynäs IF||E.ON Arena||5,802
|-
|Södertälje SK||3–3||Rögle BK||AXA Sports Center||6,130
|-
|Skellefteå AIK||5–0||Modo Hockey||Skellefteå Kraft Arena||5,162
|-
|rowspan="6"|44||rowspan="6"|Saturday, January 24||Djurgårdens IF||2–1||Brynäs IF||Hovet||8,094
|-
|Luleå HF||5–0||Södertälje SK||COOP Arena||4,739
|-
|Rögle BK||1–2||Skellefteå AIK||Lindab Arena||4,913
|-
|Färjestads BK||6–3||Timrå IK||Läkerol Arena||6,317
|-
|Frölunda HC||5–4 (OT)||HV71||Scandinavium||12,044
|-
|Modo Hockey||1–3||Linköpings HC||Swedbank Arena||7,028
|-
|rowspan="6"|45||rowspan="3"|Monday, January 26||Linköpings HC||2–1||Djurgårdens IF||Cloetta Center||7,029
|-
|Södertälje SK||3–2 (OT)||HV71||AXA Sports Center||4,500
|-
|Brynäs IF||2–4||Modo Hockey||Läkerol Arena||5,583
|-
|rowspan="3"|Tuesday, January 27||Luleå HF||4–2||Frölunda HC||COOP Arena||4,706
|-
|Skellefteå AIK||0–1||Färjestads BK||Skellefteå Kraft Arena||4,771
|-
|Timrå IK||3–2||Rögle BK||E.ON Arena||5,244
|-
|rowspan="6"|46||rowspan="6"|Thursday, January 29||HV71||2–2||Linköpings HC||Kinnarps Arena||7,038
|-
|Färjestads BK||3–2||Luleå HF||Löfbergs Lila Arena||7,172
|-
|Södertälje SK||1–4||Frölunda HC||AXA Sports Center||2,470
|-
|Rögle BK||3–4 (OT)||Djurgårdens IF||Lindab Arena||4,845
|-
|Modo Hockey||3–2||Timrå IK||Swedbank Arena||6,836
|-
|Skellefteå AIK||2–1 (OT)||Brynäs IF||Skellefteå Kraft Arena||5,029
|-
|rowspan="6"|47||rowspan="6"|Saturday, January 31||Linköpings HC||6–1||Modo Hockey||Cloetta Center||8,309
|-
|Frölunda HC||1–0||Skellefteå AIK||Scandinavium||11,311
|-
|Djurgårdens IF||3–5||HV71||Hovet||8,094
|-
|Rögle BK||6–2||Södertälje SK||Lindab Arena||4,661
|-
|Timrå IK||6–0||Färjestads BK||E.ON Arena||5,846
|-
|Luleå HF||5–0||Brynäs IF||COOP Arena||5,248
|-

|- 
|50||Tuesday, February 10||Frölunda HC||4–1||Brynäs IF||Scandinavium||11,497
|-
|rowspan="6"|48||rowspan="6"|Thursday, February 12||Frölunda HC||4–1||Rögle BK||Scandinavium||11,186
|-
|Södertälje SK||3–2||Färjestads BK||AXA Sports Center||2,905
|-
|Djurgårdens IF||5–2||Luleå HF||Hovet||6,834
|-
|Brynäs IF||6–1||Linköpings HC||Läkerol Arena||4,881
|-
|Timrå IK||3–3||HV71||E.ON Arena||5,414
|-
|Modo Hockey||4–1||Skellefteå AIK||Swedbank Arena||7,543
|-
|rowspan="6"|49||rowspan="6"|Saturday, February 14||Färjestads BK||8–1||Frölunda HC||Löfbergs Lila Arena||8,250
|-
|HV71||2–3||Skellefteå AIK||Kinnarps Arena||7,038
|-
|Linköpings HC||1–3||Timrå IK||Cloetta Center||8,121
|-
|Södertälje SK||0–4||Luleå HF||AXA Sports Center||3,225
|-
|Rögle BK||1–4||Brynäs IF||Lindab Arena||5,011
|-
|Modo Hockey||4–4||Djurgårdens IF||Swedbank Arena||7,600
|-
|rowspan="5"|50||rowspan="3"|Monday, February 16||Färjestads BK||6–3||Linköpings HC||Löfbergs Lila Arena||7,091
|-
|Skellefteå AIK||3–0||Södertälje SK||Skellefteå Kraft Arena||5,268
|-
|Luleå HF||6–1||Rögle BK||COOP Arena||4,905
|-
|rowspan="2"|Tuesday, February 17||Modo Hockey||4–6||HV71||Swedbank Arena||6,485
|-
|Djurgårdens IF||4–1||Timrå IK||Hovet||6,622
|-
|rowspan="6"|51||rowspan="6"|Thursday, February 19||HV71||2–3 (OT)||Frölunda HC||Kinnarps Arena||7,038
|-
|Linköpings HC||1–3||Luleå HF||Cloetta Center||7,992
|-
|Djurgårdens IF||3–4||Färjestads BK||Hovet||8,094
|-
|Rögle BK||6–2||Modo Hockey||Lindab Arena||5,071
|-
|Brynäs IF||3–1||Södertälje SK||Läkerol Arena||6,325
|-
|Timrå IK||8–0||Skellefteå AIK||E.ON Arena||5,804
|-
|rowspan="6"|52||rowspan="6"|Saturday, February 21||Södertälje SK||2–2||Timrå IK||AXA Sports Center||2,859
|-
|Linköpings HC||1–4||Frölunda HC||Cloetta Center||8,401
|-
|Färjestads BK||6–3||Modo Hockey||Löfbergs Lila Arena||8,250
|-
|Brynäs IF||4–2||Djurgårdens IF||Läkerol Arena||8,166
|-
|Skellefteå AIK||3–2 (OT)||Rögle BK||Skellefteå Kraft Arena||5,541
|-
|Luleå HF||2–1||HV71||COOP Arena||5,497
|-
|rowspan="6"|53||rowspan="3"|Monday, February 23||Modo Hockey||5–0||Luleå HF||Swedbank Arena||6,433
|-
|Timrå IK||2–3||Frölunda HC||E.ON Arena||5,624
|-
|Rögle BK||3–4 (OT)||Färjestads BK||Lindab Arena||5,031
|-
|rowspan="3"|Tuesday, February 24||HV71||3–1||Brynäs IF||Kinnarps Arena||7,038
|-
|Linköpings HC||7–5||Södertälje SK||Cloetta Center||7,004
|-
|Djurgårdens IF||2–2||Skellefteå AIK||Hovet||7,559
|-
|rowspan="6"|54||rowspan="6"|Thursday, February 26||Frölunda HC||4–2||Modo Hockey||Scandinavium||12,044
|-
|Färjestads BK||2–1||HV71||Löfbergs Lila Arena||7,626
|-
|Södertälje SK||3–1||Djurgårdens IF||AXA Sports Center||4,049
|-
|Rögle BK||3–6||Linköpings HC||Lindab Arena||4,712
|-
|Brynäs IF||4–3||Timrå IK||Läkerol Arena||7,293
|-
|Luleå HF||2–3||Skellefteå AIK||COOP Arena||5,600
|-
|rowspan="6"|55||rowspan="6"|Saturday, February 28||Skellefteå AIK||3–6||Linköpings HC||Skellefteå Kraft Arena||5,422
|-
|Modo Hockey||3–4 (OT)||Södertälje SK||Swedbank Arena||6,661
|-
|Timrå IK||2–3||Luleå HF||E.ON Arena||5,911
|-
|Brynäs IF||1–3||Färjestads BK||Läkerol Arena||7,522
|-
|Frölunda HC||5–3||Djurgårdens IF||Scandinavium||11,795
|-
|HV71||5–2||Rögle BK||Kinnarps Arena||6,996
|-

Statistical leaders

Scoring leaders

GP = Games played, G = Goals, A = Assists, Pts = Points, +/– = Plus/Minus, PIM = Penalty Minutes

Playoffs
After the regular season, the standard of 8 teams qualified for the playoffs.

Playoff bracket
In the first round, the highest remaining seed chose which of the four lowest remaining seeds to be matched against. In the second round, the highest remaining seed was matched against the lowest remaining seed. In each round the higher-seeded team was awarded home ice advantage. Each best-of-seven series followed a 1–1–1–2–1–1 format: the higher-seeded team played at home for games 2 and 4 (plus 5 and 7 if necessary), and the lower-seeded team was at home for game 1, 3 and 6 (if necessary).

Elitserien awards

Records
 January 5, 2009 – Chris Abbott, forward with Rögle BK, scored four goals in a single game against HV71, tying the current record.
 January 31, 2009 – Johan Harju, centre with Luleå HF, scored four goals in a single against Brynäs IF, tying the current record.

See also
 2008 in sports
 2009 in sports

References

External links 

Hockeyligan.se — Official site
Swehockey.se — Official statistics

1
Swedish Hockey League seasons
Swe